The National Ice Hockey League (NIHL) is a set of professional ice hockey leagues administered by the English Ice Hockey Association. It is currently the second tier of British ice hockey, below the Elite Ice Hockey League. Formerly called the English National Ice Hockey League (ENIHL), it was renamed in 2012 to recognise the inclusion of several teams from Scotland and Wales.

The English Ice Hockey Association announced a new structure of the men's senior league for the 2019/20 season, at a meeting of NIHL clubs in Warwickshire. A new ten-team division was approved to sit above the existing Division 1 in North and South, to be known as the National League.

In the inaugural 2019–2020 season the National League comprised Basingstoke Bison, Bracknell Bees, Hull Pirates, Leeds Knights, MK Lightning, Peterborough Phantoms, Romford Raiders, Sheffield Steeldogs, Swindon Wildcats and Telford Tigers. There is no promotion to or relegation from the National League.

Below the National League, the leagues are split into two regions, North and South, meaning teams do not have to travel long distances for away games. Each region has 2 divisions, with promotion and relegation between the divisions in each region.

History
The ENIHL was formed in 1996; following the dissolution of the British Hockey League (BHL), and the creation of the Ice Hockey Superleague and the British National League (BNL) as the top two tiers of British hockey. The ENIHL served as the third tier of hockey; operating below the BNL.

Tiers of British ice hockey since 1995 

Following its inaugural season, an upper tier within the ENIHL was founded, so as to serve as a league for the members of the BNL who could not afford to remain in that league due to the increased operating costs; but at the same time played ice hockey to a higher standard that of the other ENIHL teams. This division was originally known as the National Division, and during the 1997–98 season the teams in this division played dual schedules; a series of games solely amongst themselves, and another amongst all of the teams which fell under the jurisdiction of the ENIHL at this time. Solihull Blaze won the league and play-off trophies of both formats during this inaugural season.

At the start of the 1998–99 season the divisions, whilst still both under the ENIHL umbrella, performed in their own separate competitions; and the national division adopted the name Premier Division, and later on became known as the Premier League. By the end of the season the league had established itself outside of the ENIHL as the English Premier Ice Hockey League (EPIHL); reducing the ENIHL to the fourth level of Britain's ice hockey pyramid.

However, in 2005 the BNL disbanded; leaving the EPIHL to take its place as the second tier of the national game and, consequently, re-establishing the ENIHL as the third tier of British ice hockey. In April 2007, the EIHA lowered the upper age limit within the junior leagues, abolishing the under 19 age limit to become under 18. Due to the large gap from junior level to the EPIHL, many teams were forced to enter a reserve team into the ENIHL. This increased the size of the league from 22 teams through to 30 teams for the 2007–08 season. Later in the 2007 off-season, the EIHA suggested introducing an under 25 age limit across the league. However, this age limit was removed within weeks in favour of a drive towards developing players. The ENIHL was restructured for the 2008/2009 season into two regional divisions North and South, with two leagues in each regional division.

Following the 2012–13 the league was renamed the National Ice Hockey League, removing the word English due to non-English teams participating. In 2013, it was agreed at the EIHA AGM to restructure the Northern league into two conferences; Moralee and Laidler. The split was done primarily on regions and neither conference was regarded as being higher than the other. However, at the following year's AGM, it was agreed to return to a tiered Division 1 and Division 2 format. However, the conference names remained in place with Division 1 taking the Moralee Conference title and Division 2 the Laidler Conference title.

In 2014, it was agreed at the EIHA AGM to restructure the Southern Division 2 league to have Western and Eastern Conferences. Due to the odd-number of teams in the league, the Eastern Conference had six teams while the Western Conference had five teams. Both conferences were run completely separately and each winner was only regarded as being the conference winner, with no implication of one conference winner being regarded as the league winner. A two-round playoff format was introduced at the end of the season to determine a league-wide winner. The winner of the playoffs would then be the team promoted to Division 1. In 2017, the two conferences were reunited.

Players 
The league itself is considered to be a development league, and as such the players are normally amateur. Many teams have affiliate teams in higher leagues. Other teams are aligned with junior ice hockey clubs, and exist to ensure that when players hit 18 there is still a possibility for them to play competitive hockey if they have not joined a professional team.

The system

National League

Division 1

Division 2

Season structure
As of the 2018–19 season, the divisions are the following:

North
Each team plays each of the other teams in their league a total of four times; twice home, twice away.

At the end of the regular season, the top 4 teams in the division take part in the Playoff weekend, which are one-off games, replacing the previous home/away format. There is not usually a third placed Playoff. Blackburn Hawks currently hold the record of most consecutive final appearances with four from 2011/12 to the present season, winning in 2012/13 and 2014/15.

The rules regarding promotion and relegation between the Moralee and Laidler regularly change.

There are occasional cup competitions, but the format changes in most seasons but usually takes part in a league format.

South
Each team plays each of the other teams in their league a total of four times; twice home, twice away.

Unlike the North, the South keep a two-legged home-and-away format throughout the playoffs. In Division 1, this is a three-rounded format, involving the teams who finished in the top 8 of the regular season. In Division 2, this is a two-rounded format, involving the teams who finished in the top 2 of their conference. In the semi-finals, the conference winners play the runners-up from the other conference with the final involving the winners of the two semi-finals.

Division 1 has a Cup competition involving six of the teams. These are initially split into two groups of three, with the top two from each group going on to a knock-out, two-legged semi-final and final.

Division 2 has a Cup competition involving eight teams. These are initially split into two groups of four, with each group containing two teams from each conference. The top two teams from each group go onto a single Cup Final Weekend held in a single venue, with semi-finals on the Saturday determining the two teams to play the final on the Sunday.

League champions

Rules

Follows International Ice Hockey Federation (IIHF) rules, as used by countries in all major European leagues. There are significant differences between the National Hockey League rules and IIHF rules, including rink dimension, netminder puck handling, and icing.

The ENIHL also operates under additional EIHA regulations.

Additional discipline rules are also enforced by the EIHA, which include;
 Team fines of up to £5,000 for failure to complete a fixture
 A points system for misconduct and match penalties
 Player suspensions based upon accumulation of points
 10 points - 2-game suspension
 15 points - 3-game suspension
 20 points - 4-game suspension
 25 points - 5-game suspension
 Penalty Points for coach/managers and bench officials
 For every 20 penalty points accumulated against the team (players, coaches, managers and bench official) - £25 fine
 50 team penalty points - £100 fine
 75 team penalty points - £250 fine plus suspension
 100 team penalty points - £250 plus the £250 suspended fine awarded at 75 points = £500 total fine

See also
:Category:Seasons in English ice hockey: This category contains links to annual club and league reviews.

References

Organisations based in Lancashire
Sport in Blackpool
Second tier ice hockey leagues in Europe
Eng
1996 establishments in England
Sports leagues established in 1996
Professional ice hockey leagues in the United Kingdom